Ian Mendes (born December 28, 1976 in Mississauga, Ontario) is a Canadian journalist with The Athletic. Mendes covers the Ottawa Senators and the NHL for the online newspaper. He formerly worked for TSN 1200 Radio and previously covered the Senators with Sportsnet East, a television sports channel serving Eastern Ontario, Quebec and the Atlantic provinces.

Bio
After graduating from Carleton University's Journalism Program in 1998, Mendes entered public relations with the Ottawa Lynx AAA baseball club, and wound up working on two occasions as their mascot, Lenny the Lynx. After a brief stint with the Ottawa Senators' Public Relations Department, he joined Sportsnet in 2001 where he covered several MLB World Series and NHL Stanley Cups. During the 2012 World Series he was hit in the back with a foul ball during batting practice just as he was about to go live, the video clip of the incident has over 2M views on YouTube. He currently covers the Ottawa Senators and the National Hockey League for The Athletic.

Mendes is of Goan Indo-Canadian descent and has two daughters with his wife Sonia.

References

External links
Ian Mendes' bio @ sportsnet.ca
Mendes' Blog

1976 births
Canadian people of Indian descent
Living people
Carleton University alumni
Canadian people of Goan descent
Canadian television sportscasters
People from Mississauga
20th-century Canadian people
21st-century Canadian people